John Yorke AtLee (1853–1933) was a pioneer recording artist in the 1890s in the United States. 

AtLee was born in Washington, D.C. on March 22, 1853. He was working as a government clerk in Washington D.C. when the Columbia Phonograph Company was incorporated in January 1889. AtLee was one of Columbia's star artists of the early 1890s, second only to the U.S. Marine Band. Due to the Columbia Phonograph Company's early adoption of musical recording, AtLee was one of the first popular recording musicians.

AtLee was known for his virtuosic whistling, a style popular in vaudeville at the time. His signature tune was The Mocking Bird, an 1855 song by Richard Milburn. AtLee recorded prolifically for Columbia through 1897, and in 1898 went on to record for the Berliner Gramophone Company, singing 'The Whistling Coon' and 'The Laughing Song', signatures of George W. Johnson, another prominent whistler. His final recordings were for the Victor Talking Machine Company in May 1900. 

AtLee married Ann Jennette Klock in 1883 in Prince George's County, Maryland. He died in Philadelphia on November 24, 1933.

References

1853 births
1933 deaths
Animal impersonators
19th-century American musicians
Berliner Gramophone artists
Columbia Records artists
Musicians from Washington, D.C.
Pioneer recording artists
Whistlers